Feathering is a technique used in computer graphics software to smooth or blur the edges of a feature. The term is inherited from a technique of fine retouching using fine feathers.

Paintbrush feathering
Feathering is most commonly used on a paintbrush tool in computer graphics software.  This form of feathering makes the painted area appear smooth.  It may give the effect of an airbrush or spraypaint.  Color is concentrated at the center of the brush area, and it blends out toward the edges.

Selection feathering
Feathering is not only used on paintbrushes in computer graphics software.  Feathering may also blend the edges of a selected feature into the background of the image.  When composing an image from pieces of other images, feathering helps make added features look "in place" with the background image.  For instance, if someone were to want to add a leaf to a photograph of grass using computer graphics software, he or she might use feathering on the leaf to make it blend in with the grassy background.

Clone tool feathering
The "Clone" tool is very important in photograph manipulation on computer graphics software.  The clone tool is used to actively copy and offset pixels from one area of an image to another while the artist moves the clone tool around the area to be copied.  A good example is the use of the clone tool to cover a skin blemish by copying skin from one area of an image and placing it over the blemish.  An important aspect of making a clone tool blend well in an image is to use feathering on the clone tool.  This makes the pixels being copied have more effect on the area they are copied to closer to where the artist is dragging his or her mouse or stylus, and makes the pixels have less effect the farther they are from the clone tool (and where the artist is using it).  Thus, with the skin example, skin pixels copied directly over the blemish will have strong effect on the blemish, thus hiding it, but skin pixels copied to the area around the blemish will not affect this area much, and will keep the natural look of the skin (wrinkles etc.) intact as much as possible.

See also
Metering mode
Vignetting
Aliasing

References
Airey, Theresa. Creative Digital Printmaking.  Google Books
Evening, Martin. Adobe Photoshop CS2 for Photographers.  Google Books
Tips & Tricks

Computer graphic techniques